Harby may refer to:

Places
Harby, Leicestershire, England
 Clawson, Hose and Harby, a civil parish in Leicestershire
 Harby and Stathern railway station, a former station in Leicestershire 
Harby, Nottinghamshire, England
 Doddington and Harby railway station, a former station on the Notts-Lincs border
Hårby, Denmark
Harby near Kalmar in Sweden

People
 Harby baronets
 Arthur Harby (1906–1989), English rower
 Harold Harby (1894–1978), Norwegian-born Los Angeles councillor
 Isaac Harby (1788–1828), American teacher, playwright, literary critic etc.
 Kathryn Harby-Williams (born 1969), Australian netball player and TV presenter
 Lee Cohen Harby (1849–1918), American writer
 Harby Sangha (born 1986), Indian actor, comedian and singer